Dharamkot may refer to the following places in India:
 Dharamkot, Moga, a city in Punjab
 Dharamkot, Himachal Pradesh, a hill station in Himachal Pradesh

See also 
 Dharmpur (disambiguation)